Enolmis vivesi is a moth of the family Scythrididae. It was described by Bengt Å. Bengtsson and Pietro Passerin d'Entrèves in 1988. It is found in Spain.

Etymology
The species is named in honour of Dr. A. Vives, Madrid, who provided much of the type material.

References

Scythrididae
Moths described in 1988